Baïbokoum is the capital city of the Monts de Lam department of the Logone Oriental Region in Chad. In a 2009 census, its population was 18,685.

Baibokoum is located in the Baibokoum sub-prefecture

References 

Populated places in Chad